Larry Victor Faircloth (born July 23, 1948) is an American politician from the state of West Virginia. He is a member of the Republican Party.

Faircloth graduated from Musselman High School in Inwood, West Virginia, and James Rumsey Vocational-Technical Center. He majored in business administration at Shepherd College, and opened his own realty business. In 1980, Faircloth ran for the seat in the 35th district of the West Virginia House of Delegates

Faircloth served in the House of Delegates for twelve terms, where he represented the southern portion of Berkeley County, West Virginia. Faircloth ran in the 2011 special election to fill the remainder of Joe Manchin's term as Governor of West Virginia, losing the party nomination to Bill Maloney. In 2012, he opted not to run for reelection to the House of Delegates, and instead ran for West Virginia State Auditor, losing to incumbent Glen Gainer III.

Faircloth resides in Inwood. He has polio in his right leg.

References

Living people
1948 births
Republican Party members of the West Virginia House of Delegates
People from Inwood, West Virginia
2004 United States presidential electors